The Archbishop of New York is the head of the Roman Catholic Archdiocese of New York, who is responsible for looking after its spiritual and administrative needs.  As the archdiocese is the metropolitan see of the ecclesiastical province encompassing nearly all of the state of New York, the Archbishop of New York also administers the bishops who head the suffragan dioceses of Albany, Brooklyn, Buffalo, Ogdensburg, Rochester, Rockville Centre and Syracuse.  The current archbishop is Timothy M. Dolan.

The archdiocese began as the Diocese of New York, which was created on April 8, 1808.  R. Luke Concanen was appointed its first bishop; however, he was unable to leave the Italian Peninsula due to the Napoleonic Wars and died before he could set out for New York.  Under the reign of his successor, John Connolly, a canonical visitation of the diocese was conducted.  On account of the population increase due largely to Catholic immigrants from Ireland and Germany, the Holy See decided to elevate the diocese to the status of archdiocese on July 19, 1850.  John Hughes became the first archbishop of the newly-formed metropolitan see.  Because of the prominence of the position and the challenges that accompany it, Pope John Paul II described the office as "archbishop of the capital of the world."

Ten men have been Archbishop of New York; another three were bishop of its predecessor diocese.  Of these, only one (John Dubois) was neither born in Ireland nor was second-generation Irish.  Eight archbishops were elevated to the College of Cardinals.  John McCloskey, the fifth ordinary of the archdiocese, was the first archbishop to be born in the United States, as well as the first born in what is now New York City.  When he was raised to cardinal in 1875, he became the first cardinal from America.  Francis Spellman had the longest tenure as Archbishop of New York, serving for 28 years from 1939 to 1967, while Concanen held the position for 26 months (1808–1810), marking the shortest episcopacy.

List of ordinaries

Bishops of New York

Archbishops of New York

Notes

References
General

 

Specific

Bibliography

Christianity in New York City
New York
Roman Catholic archbishops